The Glasgow Central by-election was a Parliamentary by-election held on 2 March 1909. The constituency returned one Member of Parliament (MP) to the House of Commons of the United Kingdom, elected by the first past the post voting system.

Vacancy

Sir Andrew Torrance had been Liberal MP for the seat of Glasgow Central since the 1906 general election. He died on 4 February 1909 at the age of 64.

Electoral history
The seat had been Liberal since they gained it in 1906;

Candidates

The local Liberal Association selected 68-year-old Tommy Bowles to defend the seat. At the 1892 general election, he was elected as Conservative Party Member of Parliament for King's Lynn and served in the House of Commons until losing his seat at the 1906 election. He was a Free trade supporter and left the Conservatives when they adopted a policy of Trade tariffs.

The Conservatives selected 59-year-old Rt Hon. Charles Dickson as their candidate. Educated at the High School of Glasgow, the University of Glasgow and the University of Edinburgh he served as the Solicitor General for Scotland from 14 May 1896 to 1903 and as Lord Advocate from 1903 to 1905. He was appointed a Privy Counsellor in 1903. He was Member of Parliament for Glasgow Bridgeton from 1900 to 1906 when he was defeated.

Campaign
Polling Day was fixed for 2 March 1909, 26 days after the death of Torrance.

The constituency included Glasgow's business district. The Liberals concentrated on fiscal issues. The Conservatives successfully raised the Irish problem. Bowles tried to win free trade Conservative votes by qualifying his support for Home Rule, favouring it only within a United Kingdom framework. There were about 2,000 Irish in the district. The United Irish League did not give Bowles their support until 27 February. The Conservative Chief Whip apparently had some fear of Dickson 'wobbling' over tariff reform but steadied him with a warning letter.

Result
The Conservatives gained the seat;

Bowles reaction to the result: "The Irish injured me, the Unemployed deserted to the enemy and biggest and worst defection of all, the determining elector, the businessman, who last time voted against Balfour and protection, this time voted against the Government and the Budget."

Aftermath
Bowles was re-elected for King's Lynn at the January 1910 as a Liberal. Dickson was re-elected here;

References

Glasgow Central by-election
1900s elections in Scotland
Glasgow Central by-election
Glasgow Central by-election
Central
1900s in Glasgow